The National Diaspora Agency (AKD) is a state body within the Albanian Government responsible for relations with the Diaspora. The Agency's mission is to develop and deepen institutional cooperation with the Diaspora community through improving and protecting the rights and interests of Albanian citizens in the countries where they live. It intends to provide assistance for the preservation of the national cultural heritage and the promotion of economic cooperation between the country of origin and the diaspora. The agency is under the supervision of the Minister of State for Diaspora, Pandeli Majko.

Structure 
At the head of this institution is the Steering Council, consisting of 7 members, which function in a collegial manner. The members are representatives from the Ministry of Diaspora; Ministry of Foreign Affairs; Ministry of Internal Affairs; Ministry of Finance and Economy; Ministry of Education, Sports and Youth; Ministry of Culture; as well as by the Central Election Commission.

AKD prepares periodic reports for the Assembly and the Council of Ministers on the diaspora activity, which may be funded from various donations and projects.

References